Ophieulima is a genus of parasitic sea snails, marine gastropod mollusks in the family Eulimidae.

Species
 † Ophieulima antecessor Lozouet, 1999 †
 Ophieulima fuscoapicata Warén, 1981
 Ophieulima minima (Dall, 1927)

References

 Lozouet, P., 1999. - Nouvelles espèces de gastéropodes (Mollusca: Gastropoda) de l'Oligocène et du Miocène inférieur d'Aquitaine (sud-ouest de la France). Partie 2. Cossmanniana 6(1-2): 1-68

External links
 Warén A. & Sibuet M. 1981. Ophieulima (Mollusca, Prosobranchia), a new genus of ophiuroid parasites. Sarsia, 66: 103-107
 To World Register of Marine Species

Eulimidae